Naradmuni Thulung was a Nepalese politician, belonging to the Nepali Congress. He was an anti-Rana democratic politician. He took charge of the Bhojpur Front during the 1951 democratic revolution of Nepal. In November 1951 he became Minister of Local Self-Development in the cabinet of Matrika Prasad Koirala. He held the position until August 1952. He also served as Defence minister and acted as Prime Minister during Matrika P Koirala's premiership. Thulung became the chairman of the Royal Land Reform Commission. Under Thulung's chairmanship the commission suggested introduction of land limits, tenancy and agriculture loans. These reforms were, however, not implemented. He was born on Chaitra 27, 1965 Vikram Samvat and died on Magh 22, 2047 Vikram Samvat (8 April 1909 to 5 February 1991 AD).

Book 
Kiratko Nalibeli (किरातको नालीबेली)

References

Government ministers of Nepal
Nepali Congress politicians from Koshi Province
Rai people

1909 births
1991 deaths